The Swedish University of Agricultural Sciences, or Swedish Agricultural University (Swedish: Sveriges lantbruksuniversitet) (SLU) is a university in Sweden. Although its head office is located in Ultuna, Uppsala, the university has several campuses in different parts of Sweden, the other main facilities being Alnarp in Lomma Municipality, Skara, and Umeå. Unlike other state-owned universities in Sweden, it is funded through the budget for the Ministry of Enterprise and Innovation (previously the Ministry for Rural Affairs). The University was co-founder of the Euroleague for Life Sciences (ELLS) which was established in 2001.

The university has four faculties: Faculty of Landscape Planning, Horticulture and Agricultural Sciences, Faculty of Natural Resources and Agriculture Sciences, Faculty of Veterinary Medicine and Animal Science and Faculty of Forest Sciences. SLU had in 2020 3155 full-time staff, 4216 full-time students, 559 research students and 191 professors.


History

The university was formed in 1977 by combining three existing separate colleges for veterinary medicine, forestry and agriculture, as well as some smaller units into one organisation in order to improve the efficiency by sharing resources between departments. At the same time, the Veterinary college and Forestry college were moved from Stockholm to Ultuna, which already was the main campus of the Agricultural college. The locations used by the two relocated colleges are today used by the Stockholm University.

These colleges had a long history as separate institutions. The Veterinary Institution in Skara was founded in 1775 and was headed by Peter Hernqvist, a student of both Carl von Linné and of Claude Bourgelat, who founded the first veterinary college in Lyon in 1762. From 1821 a new veterinary institution in Stockholm took over the training of veterinarians from Skara. The Institute of Forestry was founded in Stockholm in 1828 to provide higher education to those who had gone through practical forestry schools, and was made into a college 1915. An agricultural institute was founded in Ultuna in 1848 and in Alnarp in 1862, under the supervision of the Royal Swedish Academy of Agriculture, founded in 1813. These institutes, and the experimental activities conducted by the Academy from 1814, were the basis of the Agricultural College, which was created in 1932.

Academics 
The Journal of Forest Economics was published by Elsevier, in affiliation with the Department of Forest Economics. It was founded by Sören Wibe. In 2019, the journal was taken over by Now Publishers.

In the 2020 QS World University Ranking, SLU was ranked at 3rd place in the world for the subject Agriculture and Forestry.

Notable alumni
 Professor Anna Tibaijuka – Tanzanian Minister of Lands, Housing and Human Settlements and former Executive Director of UN–HABITAT

See also

 Umeå University
 Uppsala University
 List of universities in Sweden
 List of forestry universities and colleges
 Lund University

References

External links
 Swedish University of Agricultural Sciences – Official site


 
Educational institutions established in 1977
Veterinary schools
Uppsala
Education in Uppsala
1977 establishments in Sweden
Agricultural universities and colleges in Sweden
Forestry education
Veterinary medicine in Sweden